Operation Forough Javidan (Operation Eternal Light, MeK's codename) and Operation Mersad (Operation Ambush, Iranian codename) were among the last major military operations of the Iran–Iraq War. 

In July 1988, Iraqis forces and 7,000 militants from the Mujahedin-e-Khalq (MEK) invaded Iranian Kurdistan, hoping to capture Kermanshah. The MEK militants were armed, equipped and given air support by the Iraqi military. Led by Lieutenant-General Ali Sayad Shirazi, Operation Mersad began on 26 July 1988 and lasted only a few days, whereby the Iranian Armed Forces defeated MEK forces.

Prelude and objectives
On 20 July 1987 the Iran–Iraq War was coming to an end under the United Nations Security Council Resolution 598. Iran had suffered major defeats in southern Iraq during the Second Battle of Al Faw and Operation Tawakalna ala Allah as well as along the central portion of the border within Iran, and was contemplating on accepting the ceasefire. The MEK-Iraqi operation Eternal Light would occur on July 26 1988, six days after Ayatollah Khomeini had officially announced his acceptance of the UN brokered ceasefire resolution.

Both Iran and Iraq had accepted United Nations Security Council Resolution 598, which would end the war on 8 August 1988. However, the Iraqi-backed Mujahedin-e-Khalq militant group seized the opportunity to attack central part of the Iran-Iraq border before the ceasefire came into effect.

The attack agreed upon by the Iraqi leadership would be a two pronged assault. One portion of the MEK force would attack Iranian forces in Iraqi Kurdistan, an area that was still in Iranian and Peshmerga hands. When the Iranian troops moved to fight off the MEK attack in Kurdistan, the opposition Iranian militant group Mujahedeen-e Khalq (MEK), supported by Iraqi air power, would launch a large scale incursion into the central portion of Iran, aiming towards the heart of Iran. The MEK under their leader Massoud Rajavi harbored the hope that the attack would lead to a general uprising against the Islamic government of Ayatollah Khomeini. Rajavi would lead the Mujahedeen with Iraqi support in an attack on the western borders of Iran.

Saddam's official explanation for launching Operation Eternal Light was that he wanted capture more Iranian POWs so as to exchange Iraqi POWs in Iran. However, Dilip Hiro finds this explanation unconvincing. Instead Hiro argues Saddam wanted to impress Iraq's military superiority and wanted to end the Iran-Iraq war not in a stalemate but instead an Iraqi victory.

Operations Eternal Light and Mersad 

On 26 July 1988, the MEK, with the support of the Iraqi military, started Operation Forough Javidan (Eternal Light) in central Iran. In the face of Iraqi chemical attacks, Iran had evacuated Qasr-e Shirin and Sarpol-e Zahab. These two towns were to be used by the MEK to push further into Iran. On July 26, the MEK advanced further into Iran in coordination with the Iraqi Air Force and captured Kerend-e Gharb and Islamabad-e Gharb. The MEK and Iraqi forces razed to ground the city of Islamabad-e Gharb, which had a population of 15,000. This act alienated the local Kurdish population. They also captured key strongholds along the Baghdad-Tehran highway.

The MEK met scant resistance from the limited numbers of Revolutionary Guards, which were promptly defeated, pushing 145 km (90 mi) deep into Iran towards the provincial capital city of Kermanshah. Iran's Kurdish fighters did slow the advance, allowing time for the Iranians to prepare their counteroffensive.

The MEK's next target was the provincial capital city of Kermanshah, with a population of 500,000. Iran allowed the MEK to advance to the city but had prepared an ambush. This counterattack, called Operation Mersad was led by Lieutenant General Ali Sayyad Shirazi. Iran cut off MEK's supply lines, by landing paratroopers them.

As the Iraqi airforce did not venture beyond Islamabad-e Gharb, Iranian airforce attacked the MEK forces. Iranian Air Force F-4 Phantoms bombed Mujahedeen convoys on the Kermanshah highway, followed by Army Aviation helicopters using anti-tank missiles. Most enemy armour was destroyed, in a miniature version of the Highway of Death during the Persian Gulf War.

The MEK advance had been abruptly and completely halted. The Iranian army and Revolutionary Guard then moved north from Khuzestan, encircling and suppressing the remaining resistance in the city of Kerend-e Gharb on 29 July 1988.

On 31 July, Iran drove MEK forces out of Qasr-e-Shirin and Sarpol Zahab, though the MEK claimed to have "voluntarily withdrawn" from the towns. Iran estimated that 4,500 Mujahedeen soldiers were killed, while 400 Iranian soldiers died. Many senior MEK commanders were killed, and many MEK militants were not given quarter. Iran claimed it destroyed 200 tanks and 700 other vehicles.

The Iranian successes during Operation Mersad were partially because of effective coordination between the Army and the Revolutionary Guard.

Aftermath 

Operation Mersad was the last land battle of the Iran–Iraq War.

The last notable combat actions of the war took place on 3 August 1988, in the Persian Gulf when the Iranian navy fired on a freighter and Iraq launched chemical attacks on Iranian civilians, killing an unknown number of them and wounding 2,300.

Both sides eventually withdrew to the international border in the coming weeks, with Resolution 598 becoming effective on 8 August 1988, ending all combat operations between the two countries.[102] By 20 August 1988, peace with Iran was restored. UN peacekeepers belonging to the UNIIMOG mission took the field, remaining on the Iran–Iraq border until 1991. While the war was now over, Iraq spent the rest of August and early September clearing the Kurdish resistance. Using 60,000 troops along with helicopter gunships, chemical weapons (poison gas), and mass executions, Iraq hit 15 villages, killing rebels and civilians, and forced tens of thousands of Kurds to relocate to forced settlements.[99] Many Kurdish civilians immigrated to Iran. By 3 September 1988, the anti-Kurd campaign ended, and all resistance had been crushed.[99] 400 Iraqi soldiers and 50,000 Kurdish civilians and soldiers had been killed.

At least in part as a response to the invasion, Iran executed several thousand political prisoners across the country for treason, mainly members of the MEK, but also members of the Tudeh Party (Communist Party) and other opposition groups. The estimates for number of executions vary from as little as 1,400 to as high as 12,000. The most likely number was given by dissident Ayatollah Hussein-Ali Montazeri, as being between 3,800–4,500. The death toll may have been higher for those MEK executed by frontline court-martials or dying in prison.

Ali Sayad Shirazi was the Iranian commander responsible for the coordination between the Revolutionary Guard and the Iranian army, that was responsible for the success of Operation Mersad. In April 1999, an MEK operative posing as a roadsweeper killed Shirazi outside his home.

Bibliography

See also
People's Mujahedin of Iran
Massoud Rajavi
Operation Forty Stars

References

External links 
 
 sajed.ir in English – The Official site of Holy Defence – Iraq-Iran War 1980–88

Conflicts involving the People's Mojahedin Organization of Iran
Military operations of the Iran–Iraq War in 1988
Military operations of the Iran–Iraq War involving the Peshmerga